Greenwood is a town in Taylor County, Wisconsin, United States. The population was 642 at the 2000 census. The unincorporated community of Interwald is located in the town.

Geography
According to the United States Census Bureau, the town has a total area of 54.3 square miles (140.7 km2), of which, 54.3 square miles (140.6 km2) of it is land and 0.1 square miles (0.1 km2) of it (0.09%) is water.

History

Most of the edges of the six by six squares that would become Greenwood were surveyed in October 1861 by a crew working for the U.S. government. In early 1862, the same crew marked all the section corners in the township, walking through the woods and swamps, measuring with chain and compass. When done, the deputy surveyor filed this general description for the western six by six square:
The surface of this Township is level and the soil good - well adapted for agricultural purposes. The Timber is large, among which is scattering White Pine of a Superior quality.

Demographics
As of the census of 2000, there were 642 people, 234 households, and 186 families residing in the town. The population density was 11.8 people per square mile (4.6/km2). There were 295 housing units at an average density of 5.4 per square mile (2.1/km2). The racial makeup of the town was 98.60% White, 0.16% Native American, 0.16% Asian, 0.31% from other races, and 0.78% from two or more races. Hispanic or Latino of any race were 0.62% of the population.

There were 234 households, out of which 33.3% had children under the age of 18 living with them, 71.4% were married couples living together, 2.6% had a female householder with no husband present, and 20.1% were non-families. 17.5% of all households were made up of individuals, and 6.8% had someone living alone who was 65 years of age or older. The average household size was 2.74 and the average family size was 3.12.

In the town, the population was spread out, with 26.3% under the age of 18, 6.5% from 18 to 24, 28.8% from 25 to 44, 24.3% from 45 to 64, and 14.0% who were 65 years of age or older. The median age was 38 years. For every 100 females, there were 115.4 males. For every 100 females age 18 and over, there were 112.1 males.

The median income for a household in the town was $34,000, and the median income for a family was $42,500. Males had a median income of $27,321 versus $21,528 for females. The per capita income for the town was $14,120. About 10.2% of families and 12.7% of the population were below the poverty line, including 14.2% of those under age 18 and 16.3% of those age 65 or over.

References

Towns in Taylor County, Wisconsin
Towns in Wisconsin